Ishiyama is a Japanese surname. Notable people with the surname include:

 George Ishiyama, Japanese-American businessman
 John Ishiyama, political scientist
 Masumi Ishiyama (born 1981), Japanese cricketer

Fictional characters:
 Yumi Ishiyama, main character from the French animated TV series Code Lyoko and Code Lyoko: Evolution.
 Principal Ishiyama, secondary character from Danny Phantom

See also
 Ishiyama Hongan-ji, a Japanese building

Japanese-language surnames